Kainoi or Caeni is the name of a Thracian tribe, mentioned by the Roman historian Livy.

References

See also
List of Thracian tribes

Ancient tribes in the Balkans
Thracian tribes